Bolshaya Kudara (Yekhe Khüderi) is a rural locality (a selo) in Kyakhtinsky District, Republic of Buryatia, Russia. The population was 740 as of 2010. There are 17 streets.

Geography 
Bolshaya Kudara is located 65 km southeast of Kyakhta (the district's administrative centre) by road. Oktyabrsky is the nearest rural locality.

References 

Rural localities in Kyakhtinsky District